Nafez Assaily, born in 1956 in the West Bank, in the Old City of Jerusalem grew up in Hebron, and is a sociologist and Palestinian peace activist. As early as 1997 he was defined as a Palestinian who had argued for a comprehensive strategy of non-violence through 43 years of the failure to achieve anything by armed struggle.

Life and activism 
Though a Sufi Muslim, he received his early education at Christian schools in Jerusalem – the first a Roman Catholic primary school, the other a Coptic Orthodox secondary school, and went on then began his tertiary studies at An-Najah National University in Nablus, where he majored in English and sociology. His background thus afforded him a familiarity with three distinct religious traditions each of which would contribute to his non-violent philosophy. His views on non-violence were shaped by Islamic mysticism, by Buddhism, and Gandhi, the 1982 film.

Encounter with Awad
He obtained a master's degree in peace studies and conflict resolution. A significant moment in his awareness came when he, a teacher of English in Jerusalem at the time, heard a talk in 1983 given by Mubarak Awad, a Christian Palestinian, and began to work under him. It was this talk which convinced Nafez that the idea of non-violence was not merely a pipe dream. Lucy Nusseibeh had invited Awad to talk at Birzeit University and, at the time, such talk was dangerous. According to her husband, the philosopher Sari Nusseibeh
 "At the time, to put forward the image of yourself as a non-violent person was not kosher in the Palestinian community. You had to put yourself forward as a guy with a gun, with ten guns hanging around your waist and shoulders, or keep silent."

Awad had founded the Palestinian Centre for the Study of Nonviolence (PCSN). When Awad was under threat of deportation he had to cancel his month-long appointment to the Gamaliel Chair at the Metropolitan Milwaukee Lutheran Campus ministry, and Assaily took his place, received a standing ovation from representatives from 51 church representatives in Milwaukee presbytery, and delivering addresses on 40 occasions. In June 1988, Awad was expelled from Israel, and Nafez became the center's acting director.

Broader issues
As director of PCSN, Assaily pressed Israel to enable family reunifications among Palestinians who were left separated from each other in 1967. Over a 23-year period, according to a Red Cross estimate, Israel had only approved of 9,000 reunifications among the 140,000 petitions requesting such permits. Israel allowed such reunions for Ethiopian and Russian Jews, and in 1990 Assaily forwarded a specific request to have 140 women and children who had been deported returned to their families.

Interviewed on the occasion of the 1990 Temple Mount riots in which some 20 Palestinians were killed, Assaily said provocations by either side were not the point: the problem was that Israel desired all of Jerusalem as its capital, whereas the Palestinians insist that East Jerusalem, where the Haram al-Sharif/Temple Mount lies, be the capital of a future Palestinian state.

Books on Wheels
In 1986 he developed, in collaboration with the PCSN, his own project of a mobile book-loan service called "Library on Wheels for Nonviolence and Peace" (LOWNP) in Hebron in order to encourage reading among the youth of the town, and in particular the study of non-violence. Blind children in the area can borrow books on cassettes. Puppet shows are also organized in order to teach children ways towards peace. Where the terrain did not allow the Mobile Library to pass, books were loaded onto a donkey, a "library on  donkeys", in order to reach outlying homes in the hills. According to a professor of Middle Eastern history, Sheila Katz
The library touched thousands of families over the next three decades, teaching traditions of nonviolence and peace in Islam to empower participation in social change.

One estimate puts the number of people which have been reached by LOWNP's work at some 50,000 people over the two decades. In 2009 alone Assaily visited 83 villages and lent some 11426 books to 1496 children in the Hebron area.

In time Assaily's work received funding from organisations like the World Health Organization, Pax Christi, Caritas Internationalis and Misereor, which enabled him in 2007 to branch out by developing a subsidiary Books Along the Divide service in order to furnish with reading materials young Palestinians, in taxis and buses, who found themselves obliged to wait for long periods to pass many of the 540 Israeli checkpoints. The material consists of texts on non-violence, biographies of Moses, Joseph and Jesus and works penned by Gandhi.

First Intifada
Assaily's research on pamphleteering in the several months following the outbreak of the First Intifada, according to which, of the 17 leaflets circulating, 163 actions were called for, and of the 17 methods advocated for resisting the occupation, 26 were non-violent, has been cited by historians such as Mark Tessler, Samuel J. Eldersveld Collegiate Professor, Philip Mattar and others in comprehensive studies of Palestinians and the Israeli-Palestinian conflict. Of that intifada, which formally endorsed recourse to means of non-violent resistance against the occupation, Assaily stated that, "In 1967 they (Israel) defeated the armies of three countries in six days, but they [could not] defeat the intifadah." The lesson he drew was that Israel had a harder time coping with non-violent opposition than with an actual war.

Practical techniques of non-violent resistance
Assaily recounts episodes of how he advises people struck by settler violence to respond:
Once Israeli soldiers razed all the trees in a community's olive grove.  So I convened  all of the families involved and told them that the proper response was not to react violently but to persevere. They had to replant the trees. The first time they did this, all of the seedlings were torn out once more, but on the second occasion we did things differently.   To replant them again we bided our time until Israel celebrated the Earth Day festival, when everyone plants a tree. I invited everyone to set about planting trees on that day and no one could raise objections, given the occasion. In the end the soldiers let us keep our trees in exchange for an undertaking to no longer plant any more trees. This was a good result, achieved without any need to throw stones, something which would have given them a pretext for attacking the (local) population."

Another method is to ask children to bring to school Fanta or Coca-Cola bottles, or cans, and then to fill them with pebbles, customarily used in throwing stones at the Israeli soldiers. The purpose of the exercise is to show children how to make a rudimentary musical instrument, in this case a maraca. He advises them to use these musical devices in front of Israeli soldiers manning checkpoints, rather than throwing stones at them.

Peaceful resistance to the confiscation of his property 
Nafez lives on the northern outskirts of Hebron. His land lay some 70 metres south of the Givat Harsina Israeli settlement, and his home 100 metres away. In response to the first Intifada, Harsina settlers built a security fence, and then, in 2000 gradually expanded, felling the olive trees and levelling the ground until the encroachment ran close up to his home. The land yielded him and his neighbours income from the grape and olive harvests, but lay under a confiscation order. In February 2004 further incursions by Harsina settlers encroached on his land: part of the vineyard was rendered inaccessible by the erection of a fence, and he coulde not obtain permission from the Israeli soldiers to cross over to the other part of his vineyard. Soldiers threatening him, he claims, with a nighttime visit to smash his head, if he persisted in pruning his vineyard on the encroached parcel of land. Two members of the Christian Peacemaker Teams stayed overnight to ensure his safety As a result of the fencing he was forced to detour some 2 kilometres on foot every day to reach his home, passing through two Israeli checkpoints. He can no longer access his home by car.Assaily eventually obtained a stop-work injunction from an Israeli court to block the continuation of works that aimed to fence off his property.

Non-violence is the key to peace 
Speaking of Palestinians generally, Assaily argues that their principle virtue is patience, but that their great defect is the slowness with which they take on fresh ideas.

His peace-campaigning is ecumenical, in that it draws on the writings of Gandhi, the Qur'an, the Torah and the New Testament. He often works to advise Palestinians demonstrating in Jerusalem on how to devise slogans that are less generic, and more in keeping with the realities of their everyday life. Jerry Levin, CNN's former Middle East Bureau Chief before he was taken hostage by Lebanese terrorists, and now member of the Christian Peacemaker Teams in the West Bank, has singled him out as a "creative Muslim exponent of non-violent activism". His long time friend Hussein Ibrahim Issa also collaborates on the project. At the outset their fellow Palestinians suspected he and his friends must be either CIA agents or collaborators with the Israelis. Issa had his house where he had set up a kindergarten, firebombed in 1988 for organizing an encounter between Palestinian and Israeli schoolchildren.

In Assaily's view, since 1948 both Israel and the Palestinians have been unsuccessful in pursuit of their respective goals. Israel in trying to achieve peace and security through the exercise of force, the Palestinians by recourse to armed struggle, therefore, he argues, the time has come for non-violent pursuit of their respective goals.
"Only the Palestinians can give them peace. The US can give them money and weapons but not peace. And the only people who can give us peace are the Israelis. The Arabs can give us money and weapons, but they can not give us peace. We must act on these two facts. More nonviolence, more effectiveness."
He continues to expound the philosophy of non-violence, and makes frequent appearances abroad as a lecturer. He was one of the five people featured in Lynn Feinerman's film, If You Make It Possible.

Pacifism has emerged from many distinct religious confessions the world over and Assaily is numbered as an influential Palestinian Sufi exponent.

Personal life
He lost the use of sight in his right eye, following his participation in a protest rally at the Al Aqsa mosque compound in 1991. Assaily had, as of 2002, six children.

See also 
 Pacifism in Islam

Notes

Citations

Sources

External links
 Nafez Assaily homepage
 Radio Radicale

1956 births
An-Najah National University alumni
Living people
Nonviolence advocates
Palestinian activists
Palestinian Muslim pacifists
Palestinian pacifists
Palestinian Sufis
People from Hebron